"Young and Beautiful" is a song written by Aaron Schroeder and Abner Silver. It was performed by Elvis Presley as the last song of the 1957 film Jailhouse Rock.

Presley recorded it on April 30, 1957, in Radio Recorders Studio, Hollywood.

"Young and Beautiful" was released on the Jailhouse Rock EP (RCA Victor EPA 4114) in October 1957.

Elvis Presley songs
Hep Stars songs
1957 songs
Songs written by Aaron Schroeder
Songs written by Abner Silver
Songs written for films